Harp Farmer born Harpreet Singh is an actor, director, producer, and photographer based in Hoshiarpur, Punjab, India.

Early life and education 
He completed his higher secondary education from DAV College, Jalandhar and then did his Bachelor of Computer Application from Apeejay College of Fine Arts, Jalandhar and Masters of Science in Advance Software Technology from International Institute of Information Technology, Pune.

Personal life 
Harp is married to Amber Kaur Farmer and the couple has a daughter Sagal Kaur Farmer and son Ajitt Singh Farmer. Family members are Father (Sardar Piara Singh), Mother (Sardarni Darshan Kaur), Harp Farmer, His wife (Amber Farmer) Children Son Ajitt and Daughter Sagal

Career 
He started his career as a photographer and his first photography exhibition was organized on 9 April 2012 at Punjab Agricultural University, Ludhiana. Subsequently, three more exhibitions were held, one was at Thakur Art Gallery, Amritsar and the second one at Alliance Française, Chandigarh in the year 2013 and third one that concluded at Kala Bhawan, Chandigarh in June 2016. He is quite famous for his self-portraits depicting farmers of Punjab. Each portrait brings out the simplicity of the rural Punjab. In February 2016, Harp Farmer Pictures released a new song called "Manmaaniyan" sing and composed by Dev Sangha featuring Harp Farmer.

Filmography/Discography

Harp Farmer Pictures 
He has started his own music record label, under his own production, Harp Farmer Pictures.

Controversies 
In May 2016, Harp started Stop Defaming Punjab campaign which urged people to fight against the propagation that more than 70% of the people of Punjab were into substance abuse in one form or the other. He drew a lot of flak for the campaign and was criticized by those who either had vested interests or had not actually understood the message. He was accused of being a mouthpiece for the ruling party which is thought to be primarily responsible for the widespread usage of drugs in the state. There was much hue and cry criticizing the campaign, though, individuals including renowned artists and a number of NGOs came forward to uphold the cause.

Prior to that, he, along with Ankur Singh Patar had pulled up a cellphone company for using his creation in an unauthorized manner.

References

External links 
 
Instagram

1984 births
Living people
People from Hoshiarpur
Male actors in Punjabi cinema